Steve is a fictional character from the 2011 video game Minecraft. Created by Swedish video game developer Markus "Notch" Persson and introduced in the initial Java-based version of Minecraft which was publicly released on May 17, 2009, Steve is one of nine default player character skins available for players of contemporary versions of Minecraft. Steve lacks an official backstory by the developers of Minecraft as he is intended to be a customizable player avatar as opposed to being a predefined character. His feminine counterpart, Alex, was first introduced in August 2014 for PC versions of Minecraft, with the other seven first debuting in the Java edition of the game in October 2022. Depending on the version of Minecraft, players have a chance of spawning as either Steve or Alex when starting a new game.

Steve became a widely recognized character in the video game industry following the critical and commercial success of the Minecraft franchise. Considered by some critics as a mascot for the Minecraft intellectual property, his likeness has appeared extensively in advertising and merchandise, including wearable apparel and collectible items. The character has also inspired a number of unofficial media and urban legends, most notably the "Herobrine" creepypasta which became widely shared around internet communities as a meme during the 2010s.

Concept and design
Steve is presented as a human character with a blocky appearance, which is consistent with the aesthetic and art style of Minecraft. His name originated as an in-joke by Persson, and was confirmed as his official name in the Bedrock Edition of Minecraft. Steve's face consists of an eight-by-eight pixel image, usually adorned with a goatee. He wears a light blue top, a pair of blue trousers, and shoes.

In spite of his masculine name and features, Persson claimed that Steve's gender was never intended to be fixed. In 2012, Persson explained that Minecraft blocky graphics inadvertently reinforced a default aesthetic for the game which is "traditionally masculine". He emphasized that Minecraft was designed to "be a game without a gender element" in a game where "gender doesn't exist", and that the character model was "intended to represent a human being" who was genderless. Admitting that limiting the gender option to just male "is telling everybody this is a boy game only", Persson claimed that he once attempted to create a proper female character model in Minecraft, but said "the results have been extremely sexist."

By August 22, 2014, another default skin that is complimentary for all Minecraft players named Alex was added to the Java Edition of Minecraft, for Windows, Macintosh, and Linux. The character was added to the console and mobile versions of Minecraft at a later date. Alex's character model is similar to Steve's, but with a more feminine appearance: she has red hair tied into a ponytail, and narrower arms. Commenting on Minecraft reputation for better gender representation compared to other video games in the industry as of the 2010s, Helen Chiang, the Microsoft studio head responsible for the Minecraft franchise, explained in a 2018 interview that it is important for her company to leverage the power of the Minecraft brand to subvert traditional gender stereotypes. By presenting Alex and Steve as having identical physical capabilities or qualities as each other, Chiang said this reinforces the studio's stance on gender equality and their commitment to its ideals.

On August 22, 2022, exactly 8 years after Alex was added, an update to the Minecraft launcher implemented a redesign of both Steve and Alex. The new skins were mostly the same as before, but were more textured. They also utilized multiple layers, a feature originally added to Minecraft's skins alongside Alex in 2014, but that had only ever been utilized by custom skins prior to this update. These redesigns also restored Steve's goatee, which had been removed in a 2009 update.

Description

Character overview
Steve is one of nine default character skins which are available for new players of Minecraft. A skin is the appearance of the player's avatar that represents the player in the game world, which can be changed, altered, or replaced by the player. Players are allowed multiple options to change the visual appearance of their player character's skin. All zombie mobs found in Minecraft appear to be wearing the same clothing as Steve, although no official explanation was ever given.

Prior to Alex's introduction, Steve was the only official skin available to players on the PC and Mobile editions of the game, though players of the PC version could use skins they've designed themselves or found online. On the original console editions of the game, up to eight variants of Steve were also offered, none of them female, in addition to a greater variety of characters that were available to those who purchased them as part of bundles. Like Steve, Alex initially could not be manually selected in these console versions, and her use is randomly assigned whenever players start a new game. As of 2022, both Steve and Alex, as well as the other seven default skins, can be manually selected in all versions of the game, either via an in-game menu or in the game launcher, depending on the version of Minecraft being played.

According to backstory provided in Lego Club Magazine, Steve and Alex are in a romantic relationship and both have distinct interests outside of their shared aptitude for building: Steve has a penchant for mining and alchemy, whereas Alex prefers exploring and hunting.

Herobrine

Herobrine is an urban legend and creepypasta which originated as a hoax propagated by an anonymous post on the English-language imageboard website 4chan. A "ghost" who haunts single-player Minecraft worlds, the character is supposed to look like a standard character model for Steve, except for a pair of glowing white eyes which lack pupils. Theories that explain the character's supposed origins range from his purported identity as Persson's supposedly deceased brother to an "unlucky miner" who haunts living players out of a desire for vengeance. The first purported sighting of Herobrine was from the time period when Minecraft was still in the alpha phase of development: an anonymous 4chan poster claimed that they spotted a character who stared at them from the dense fog between the trees before vanishing and that they received a private message from a user called Herobrine, which simply said "stop". This occurred after a subsequent post they made which inquired about the sighting was allegedly removed without explanation.

Other appearances
Steve has been featured in video game media outside of Minecraft. He appears as an exclusive playable character in the PC version of Super Meat Boy as "Mr. Minecraft". Steve's head appears in Borderlands 2 as an unlockable cosmetic. Steve's head is also unlockable to those who managed to reach level 20 as the Paladin in Hybrid.

Steve is featured as a playable character in Super Smash Bros. Ultimate; his alternate costumes transform him into Alex as well as the Zombie and Enderman enemies from Minecraft.

Steve and Alex appear as skins in Minecraft Dungeons, where Steve was the most commonly selected skin among players.

Reception

Cultural impact

Critics noted that Steve have achieved a level of cultural impact and viral recognition outside of the character's original purpose as a baseline or default skin for new players of Minecraft. As the face of the franchise in promotional and advertising materials, some commentators consider Steve to be the closest character Minecraft has to a protagonist or main character. This is in spite of the fact that his existence is not asserted by way of an official backstory or in-game dialogue unlike most other video game characters. In 2016, Glixel staff ranked Steve as the 4th most iconic video game character of the 21st century. In a 2021 list published by GamesRadar which rank 50 iconic video game characters, Rachel Weber considered Steve to be the "enduring symbol" of Minecraft, and his character model to be one of the most instantly recognizable silhouettes in video game culture.

Steve has been the subject of multiple fan theories spread around Internet communities. One theory alleged that Steve is based on Tommy Vercetti, the protagonist of Grand Theft Auto: Vice City, due to the alleged physical resemblance between both characters. It relied on a 2009 Tumblr post by Persson which documented his progress working on Minecraft, where he confirmed that he used designs inspired by Grand Theft Auto video games as a foundation for his work. In 2020 Persson publicly responded on social media and denied any tangible connections between both characters.

Another fan-spread phenomenon, the Herobrine creepypasta, is regarded as a notable horror-themed urban legend in the video game industry. Following the anonymous 4chan post, the hoax became the subject of numerous threads on Minecraft internet forums as well as user generated videos on YouTube which report alleged sightings, often annotated with red text and eerily-themed music. Two popular Minecraft livestreamers, Copeland and Patimuss, were acknowledged by Lauren Morton from PC Gamer for their contributions towards popularizing the urban legend into a viral meme. For example, Copeland posted a few edited Minecraft screenshots which shows a depiction of Herobrine to get a reaction from his viewers and staged a hoax sighting for his lifestream using a retextured painting which is made to look like Herobrine. The popularity of the Herobrine creepypasta led to a placement on a 2013 poll of the "Top 50 Video Game Villains of All Time" organized by Guinness World Records, spawned unofficial books such as The Legend of Herobrine and the Gameknight999 series of novels, and inspired fan-made skins patterned after the creepypasta. As an acknowledgement of the Herobrine meme, Mojang development staff often include the line "Removed Herobrine" within patch notes released for the game up until June 23, 2020, with the Java Edition 1.16 patch, also known as Minecraft Nether Update. Fan interest in the meme eventually culminated in early 2021 with the discovery of the world seed which contains the first instance of Herobrine's alleged sighting.

Super Smash Bros. Ultimate
The announcement and introduction of Minecraft themed DLC for Super Smash Bros. Ultimate, which is primarily represented by the Steve character, was met with a very enthusiastic response from critics and players. Some commentators suggested that much of the excitement was due to the character's unprecedented inclusion into a popular fighting game, and that in the aftermath of the reveal, social media website Twitter may have struggled with the volume of postings which were generated in response. Patricia Hernandez from Polygon and Nadia Fox from US Gamer further noted that an awkward animation which is featured during the character's end-of-match win screen scandalized some viewers, which had the effect of generating further publicity surrounding the character's imminent debut in Smash.

In his review of the Steve DLC for Ultimate, Mitchell Saltzman from IGN described Steve as one of the most complex fighters ever introduced in the game in terms of gameplay mechanics, and highlighted the inventive ways which the developers incorporated the resource collection and item crafting mechanics of Minecraft into his moveset. Kotaku staff were divided over the playable iteration of Steve in Smash. Ian Walker considered Steve to be one of the most exciting characters to play for Ultimate after  observing an event where one of the players displayed his ingenuity with Steve's construction capabilities. Ari Notis took a less favorable view and called him the strangest character he has ever played. Notis described in detail the visual and gameplay dissonances he observed from the implementation of Steve in Ultimate.

Since Steve's addition to Ultimate, the character became a point of contention within the game's competitive community, citing Steve's unorthodox playstyle and rapid rise in high placements at competitions. Some players began advocating for Steve to be banned from tournaments, fearing the character's dominance could negatively affect viewership like Bayonetta had for Super Smash Bros. for Wii U. Opponents of a ban point out that Steve is a recent addition to the game, and that effective counterplay has yet to be developed. The calls for a ban intensified after the results and picks went higher. In February 2023, Steve was named the best character in Ultimate via tier list. As of March 2023, Steve was banned in several tournaments, due to the discovery of a new tech that negates hitstun.

Analysis

In an entry about Steve from the 2017 publication 100 Greatest Video Game Characters, Chris Bailey explained that what little is known about Steve helps illuminate how video game avatars are being perceived in relation to player identity, because the character embodies and conducts the spirit of freedom and customization inherent to sandbox video games. He further elaborated that Steve exemplifies the "centrality" of relatable avatars in affording players their own creative agency in and around video games: while other games allow a certain level of avatar customization, Steve embodies this possibility more than most with a process akin to a kind of scaffolded pixel art enabling the redesign of the entire surface of the body beyond changing a pre-defined hairstyle or skin color. This process is particularly visible through the proliferation of online communities and forums set up to share user-generated adapted skins.

With regards to the concept of Steve's gender being neutral and non-binary as asserted by Persson, Bailey took the view that it is "initially difficult" to account for the inclusion of an avatar with an "evidently gendered name". Nevertheless, he observed that Minecraft player communities have embraced the game's general principle of openness due to their enthusiasm in engaging with the possibility of customizing their avatars' appearances. This is achieved through the process of overlaying a new skin over Steve's original form, which represents a player's direct input in how they want to be represented in-game. Similarly, H. Chad Lane said that the concept of skins in Minecraft, represented by Steve and Alex as the baseline, can act as a reflection of the player's identify and self-perceptions, regardless of whether it is similar to or in contrast to the player's identity in the real world.

Gabriel Menotti cited the Herobrine hoax, which involved a character which was never a real in-game entity, as an example of how the recording of playthroughs might influence the universe of Minecraft in a radical way. He believed that Persson's ambiguous answer on whether Herobrine will ever be integrated into Minecraft suggests that there is always a possibility for player imagination to be incorporated into one of the game's future updates, which is consistent with the logic behind Minecraft open development as well as its history of frequent updates that sometimes introduce game-changing novelties. The authors of Mixing and Re-Purposing Realities observed that the popularity of the Herobrine meme represents the Minecraft community's embrace of creative efforts by its members with the transition of spontaneous user-generated content into Minecraft folklore. Their survey of the study's respondents found that Herobrine is treated as a mythological destructive character which some similar traits as superhero characters.

Notes

References

Further reading

External links
 Steve's entry on NameMC—a searchable skin database 

Minecraft
2010s fads and trends
In-jokes
Microsoft protagonists
Silent protagonists
Super Smash Bros. fighters
Video game characters introduced in 2009
Video game mascots
Video game memes